The Oktedi rainbowfish (Melanotaenia oktediensis) is a species of rainbowfish in the subfamily Melanotaeniinae. It is endemic to the Ok Tedi River, part of the Fly River system in southern Papua New Guinea.  Its natural habitat is rivers.

Sources

Melanotaenia
Freshwater fish of Papua New Guinea
Taxonomy articles created by Polbot
Fish described in 1980